Qingdao Hailifeng F.C., previously named Qingdao JVC Zhengyi, Qingdao Benda and Hefei Chuangyi was a former professional association football club in the Chinese Football Association Jia League. The club was engaged in "bribery and private business dealing" in matches held in 2007 and 2009 and was banned from all future national matches organised by the Chinese Football Association.

History
Qingdao JVC Zhengyi Football Club was founded on 7 January 1995, and was renamed Qingdao Benda in 1997 and Qingdao Hailifeng in 1998. It had been a regular in China League Two until it bought Guangdong Winnerway and its place in Jia B League in December 2001, After 4 years of failure to win promotion, after the Guangdong Winnerway Group lost their patience after 4 years of failure to win promotion and agreed to sell their Jia B team to Qingdao Hailifeng.

On February 21, 2010 the club was found guilty for accepting a bribe from Chengdu Blades and had their registration cancelled as well as being fined 200,000 RMB for their crime. It was discovered that the club deliberately lost a key game 2–0 during the 2007 league season for up to 500,000 RMB to allow Chengdu Blades to win promotion.

Name history
The Qingdao club has changed its name, its home stadium, and even its home city due to financial reasons.

Their previous names include:
 1995–1996 Qingdao JVC Zhengyi 青岛JVC正义 (Qingdao)
 1997 Qingdao Benda 青岛奔达 (Qingdao)
 1998–2001 Qingdao Hailifeng 青岛海利丰 (Qingdao)
 2002 Hefei Chuangyi 合肥创亿 (Hefei)
 2003–2010 Qingdao Hailifeng 青岛海利丰 (Qingdao)

Results
As of the end of 2009 season

All-time league Ranking

:  in group stage
:  in Final Group 3
:  in Final North Group

References

External links
 News page on SINA.com (Simplified Chinese)

Defunct football clubs in China
Sport in Qingdao
Association football clubs established in 1995
Association football clubs disestablished in 2010
Football clubs in China
1995 establishments in China
2010 disestablishments in China